2-Butanol, or sec-butanol, is an organic compound with formula CH3CH(OH)CH2CH3. Its structural isomers are 1-butanol. isobutanol, and tert-butanol. 2-Butanol is chiral and thus can be obtained as either of two stereoisomers designated as (R)-(−)-2-butanol and (S)-(+)-2-butanol. It is normally encountered as a 1:1 mixture of the two stereoisomers — a racemic mixture.

This secondary alcohol is a flammable, colorless liquid that is soluble in three parts water and completely miscible with organic solvents. It is produced on a large scale, primarily as a precursor to the industrial solvent methyl ethyl ketone.

Manufacture and applications
2-Butanol is manufactured industrially by the hydration of 1-butene or 2-butene:

Sulfuric acid is used as a catalyst for this conversion.

In the laboratory it can be prepared via Grignard reaction by reacting ethylmagnesium bromide with acetaldehyde in dried diethyl ether or tetrahydrofuran.

Although some 2-butanol is used as a solvent, it is mainly converted to butanone (methyl ethyl ketone, MEK), an important industrial solvent and found in many domestic cleaning agents and paint removers. Though most paint removers have ceased using MEK in their products due to health concerns and new laws. Volatile esters of 2-butanol have pleasant aromas and are used in small amounts as perfumes or in artificial flavors.

Solubility
The listed solubility of 2-butanol is often incorrect, including some of the most well-known references such as the Merck Index, the CRC Handbook of Chemistry and Physics, and Lange's Handbook of Chemistry.  Even the International Programme on Chemical Safety lists the wrong solubility.  This widespread error originated because of Beilstein's Handbuch der Organischen Chemie (Handbook of Organic Chemistry).  This work cites a false solubility of 12.5 g/100 g water. Many other sources used this solubility, which has snowballed into a widespread error in the industrial world.  The correct data (35.0 g/100 g at 20 °C, 29 g/100 g at 25 °C, and 22 g/100 g at 30 °C) were first published in 1886 by Alexejew and then similar data was reported by other scientists including Dolgolenko and Dryer in 1907 and 1913, respectively.

Precautions
Like other butanols, 2-butanol has low acute toxicity.  The  is 4400 mg/kg (rat, oral).

Several explosions have been reported during the conventional distillation of 2-butanol, apparently due to the buildup of peroxides with the boiling point higher than that of pure alcohol (and therefore concentrating in the still pot during distillation). As alcohols, unlike ethers, are not widely known to be capable of forming peroxide impurities, the danger is likely to be overlooked. 2-Butanol is in Class B Peroxide Forming Chemicals

References

External links

Alkanols
Alcohol solvents
Secondary alcohols